Lyallia kerguelensis, commonly called the lyallia cushion (coussin de lyallia in French), is a species of flowering cushion plant in the monotypic genus Lyallia of the family Montiaceae.  It is sometimes placed in the Hectorellaceae or the Portulacaceae.  The generic name honours British botanist and naval officer David Lyall who served as assistant surgeon on HMS Terror on the Antarctic exploring expedition led by James Clark Ross from 1839 to 1843.  Lyall was a friend and colleague of describer Joseph Dalton Hooker on the expedition when the type material was collected.  The specific epithet refers to the type locality.

Description
Lyallia kerguelensis is a perennial herb.  It forms round cushions, usually 200–400 mm across, but occasionally up to 1 m in diameter.  Its closest relative is the similar cushion plant Hectorella caespitosa which is found in alpine areas of the South Island of New Zealand.

Distribution and habitat
The species is endemic to the subantarctic Kerguelen Islands, part of the French Southern and Antarctic Lands in the southern Indian Ocean.  It grows in small populations on moraines and fellfields, from the sea shore to about 300 m above sea level, and can live for at least 16 years.

References

Notes

Sources
 
 
 

Montiaceae
Flora of the Kerguelen Islands
Monotypic Caryophyllales genera
Plants described in 1847
Cushion plants